"Swervin" is a song by American rapper BlocBoy JB. It was released on March 26, 2020, through Foundation Entertainment and Interscope, as the lead single from his debut studio album FatBoy.

Background 
"Swervin" was BlocBoy's first streaming release of 2020.

Music video 
The music video was released on March 26, 2020. The video was shot at a car warehouse. In the video, BlocBoy and his friends are seen doing a dance called "The Clutch". He described the video as "last minute" with "limited resources".

The music video has currently over one million views on YouTube.

Critical reception 
The song received generally positive reviews. Sheldon Pearce of Pitchfork said the track was "proof of what BlocBoy is still capable of", and said that "the still-promising rapper rediscovers his fun-loving, tongue-in-cheek style". Charlie Zhang of Hypebeast called the track "catchy".

References 

2020 singles
2020 songs
BlocBoy JB songs